At the 1900 Summer Olympics, seven of the archery events that took place in Paris, France, are considered to be "Olympic" by Olympic historians, with 153 archers competing in them. The identities of 17 of those archers are known, though a number of those are known only by their surnames. In total 1400 archers to over 1500 archers participated in the archery competitions. It was the first time that archery was featured in the Olympics.  All seven events were for men.  Only France, Belgium, and the Netherlands sent archers.  Six Dutch archers competed; none qualified for any of the individual event finals.

Before July 2021 the IOC has never decided which events were "Olympic" and which were not. The events included here exclude many of the archery events held in France in 1900 connected to the World's Fair.  Those events, if included, would put the number of archers over 5,000. They are excluded typically because of their status as French national championships rather than international contests (even though international participants were invited) or because, as team events, they were essentially qualifiers for the final events.

The team events au berceau served as qualifying for the individual events. The top eight finishers in the team events au cordon doré were eligible to compete for the individual titles, while the top six finishers in the team events au chapelet were eligible to compete for the individual titles. Two immensely popular types of archery – short-range butt shooting in a covered gallery (au berceau) and popinjay (sur la perche) – were practiced mainly in France and Belgium. A case could be made that only one event took place au berceau, that of Championnat du Monde. This event was contested between the two best performing au berceau archers in the individual events, au cordon doré and au chapelet (Henri Hérouin and Hubert Van Innis). Thus, all the earlier events could be considered qualifying for that one final event.

Medal table

Medal summary

Participating nations
A total of 153 archers from 3 nations competed at the Paris Games:

See also
List of Olympic medalists in archery

References

 International Olympic Committee athletes database
 De Wael, Herman. Herman's Full Olympians: "Archery 1900". Accessed 17 January 2006.
 

 
1900 Summer Olympics events
1900
1900 in archery